Thomas Cade Mullooly (born 30 January 1954) is a former Australian rules footballer who was highly successful in the West Australian Football League (WAFL) playing for the Swan Districts Football Club.

Mullooly joined the club in 1971 (the same year as Ron Boucher) when the club were struggling and only won four games in the season. In 1973 Mullooly was selected for the WA state team and played on the wing against Victoria, who beat WA by 80 points. Part of the successful 1982 premiership side, Mullooly played at full back and was considered one of the team's best players. Absent from the 1983 grand final win due to injury, he played in the successful 1984 side as a fullback.

In the 1976–77 cricket season, Mullooly played one first-class and one List A match for Western Australia as a right-arm fast-medium bowler.

After his long and distinguished career at Swan Districts, he was named as a reserve in their Team of the Century and is a life member.

Perth Football Club offered Mullooly a position as coach in 1990, which he did for one season before Ken Armstrong took the position.

References

External links
Cricinfo: Thomas Mullooly

Swan Districts Football Club players
Perth Football Club coaches
Australian cricketers
Western Australia cricketers
1954 births
Living people
Australian rules footballers from Perth, Western Australia
Cricketers from Western Australia